Casey Donahew (born April 21, 1977 in Burleson, Texas) is an American Texas country music singer. His last four albums charted on the Billboard US Country top 10. The 2016 album All Night Party reached #3 on the Billboard Country chart, his highest chart position to date. On July 26, 2019, his album One Light Town was released and made its debut at #2 on the Billboard Country Album Sales chart.

Career 
Donahew began writing songs in high school, and credits past relationships as inspiration behind much of his early work, stating:

"Once you get your heart broken for the first time, you've got a lot to say, I guess. "

Eventually, he broke into the world of Texas Country, which was gaining popularity with Pat Green, Robert Earl Keen and Randy Rogers. Casey's approach to songwriting is different from typical country music artists, as he often writes about heartbreak with a unique twist on the subject, as well as his experiences in different locations across the state, most notably the Stockyards of Fort Worth.

Donahew began playing professionally in 2002 by booking mostly bar gigs and building a dedicated fanbase among younger crowds. He gained notoriety online and on airwaves throughout Texas, and reached the Top 30 on the Billboard Top Country Albums chart with the album Moving On, released in 2009.

On October 24, 2011, the Casey Donahew Band released their fourth studio album titled Double-Wide Dream exclusively on iTunes.  The album was officially released on CD, available at retailers like Best Buy, Walmart and Hastings on October 25, 2011. From this album, their single, "One Star Flag", held the number one spot on Texas Music Chart.

In 2013, the album Standoff was released.  It reached No. 7 on Top Country Albums, selling 13,000 on its debut week.

All Night Party was released on August 19, 2016. It debuted at No. 3, selling 11,000 copies in its first week. It is their highest charting album on Top Country Albums.

On October 7, 2017, Donahew released 15 Years:The Wild Ride,  15 updated recordings of Donahew’s most popular songs from the first part of his career, as well as a recording of Matchbox 20’s "3AM," a song Casey played for years live before finally recording it in the studio.

On March 29, 2019, Casey announced a new project, "One Light Town." Released on July 26, 2019, and produced by Josh Leo, "One Light Town" features 15 new songs, 7 of which were released digitally to fans when the album was announced. Donahew wrote or co-wrote 8 of the 15 songs and recorded songs by songwriters including Tim Nichols, Jimmy Yeary, Brad Tursi, Ben Hayslip, David Lee Murphy, Josh Leo, Matt Ramsey, Trevor Rosen, Jeff Hyde, Jon Randall, Rodney Clawson, Michael Lotten, Wynn Varble, Jeff Outlaw, and Steve Stone.

Discography

Studio albums

Live albums

Singles

Music videos

References

External links 

1977 births
Living people
People from Burleson, Texas
American country singer-songwriters
Singer-songwriters from Texas
21st-century American singers
Country musicians from Texas